Race Rock Light is a lighthouse on Race Rock Reef, a dangerous set of rocks on Long Island Sound southwest of Fishers Island, New York and the site of many shipwrecks. It is currently owned and maintained by the New London Maritime Society as part of the National Historic Lighthouse Preservation Act program.

Race Rock Light was built 1871–78 and designed by Francis Hopkinson Smith (1838–1915). It is an excellent example of 19th-century engineering and design. The massive masonry foundations on the reef took seven years to complete, but the stone structure, the keeper's quarters, and the tower were built in only nine months once the foundation was secure. The United States Coast Guard automated the light in 1978.

Race Rock Lighthouse was added to the National Register of Historic Places in 2005.

History
Race Rock Lighthouse stands in Long Island Sound,  from New London, Connecticut, at the mouth of the Race where the waters of the Sound rush both ways with great velocity and force.  By 1837, eight vessels had been lost in 8 years on Race Point reef.

In 1838, Congress appropriated $3,000 for a lighthouse at Race Rock but the money was never expended. In 1852, the Lighthouse Board reported: "Various efforts have been made, and numerous appropriations expended, in endeavoring to place an efficient and permanent mark on this point. Buoys cannot be kept on it, and spindles have hitherto only remained until the breaking up of the ice in the spring."

Construction of the riprap foundation began in April 1871.  In all, 10,000 tons of granite were used in the foundation. The Board reported in 1872 that the building costs were so high that "no more than the landing and the enrockment of the foundation, and two courses of the pier" could be paid for. Congress appropriated a further $75,000 in 1873, and the lighthouse was completed at a total cost of $278,716.

The ledge on which the lighthouse is built is under water and  mile from Race Point Reef. It was made approximately level with small broken stone and riprap. To form the layers of concrete, cylindrical bands of half-inch iron were used. The pier is made of heavy masonry backed with concrete and contains cisterns and cellars.

The pier is surmounted by a 1 story granite dwelling, and the granite light tower ascends from its front. The whole structure is surrounded and protected by riprap.

It was added to the National Register of Historic Places in 2005 as Race Rock Light Station. In June 2011, the General Services Administration made the Race Rock Light available at no cost to public organizations willing to preserve them  as part of the  National Historic Lighthouse Preservation Act program. The New London Maritime society took ownership of Race Rock and two other lighthouses that mark the approach to New London, Connecticut.

References

External links

Lighthouses completed in 1878
Lighthouses on the National Register of Historic Places in New York (state)
Long Island Sound
Reportedly haunted locations in New York (state)
Lighthouses in Suffolk County, New York
National Register of Historic Places in Suffolk County, New York